Leisuretime is a travel agent and tour operator specialising in coach holidays, short breaks and cruises. The company’s head office is located in the centre of Cardiff, Wales.

Company overview
Leisuretime  was founded in 1996 by Ceri Johnson who leased a vacant office at the former Cardiff Bus headquarters. Originally trading as Leisure Time Tours, the company began by running coach holidays from South Wales to destinations across the UK.

The company has expanded considerably in recent years with the opening of a new head office and call centre, a store refurbishment programme and the introduction of new pick-up points and destinations to its holiday programme. Leisuretime has also extended its partnerships with both national and independent travel agents including Thomas Cook and Travel House, and online travel agents including Door2Tour and Coachholidays.com.

In 2014 the company began to utilise its sales channels by launching partnerships with a range of third-party licensed tour operators, enabling the sale of a wider range of holidays. The company now sells travel arranged by third-parties under the Leisuretime brand alongside its Cruise Centre and CoachHoliday.com brands.

The company is a member of ABTA and various other travel organisations including the Advantage Travel Partnership.

Sponsorship
Leisuretime is a well-known sponsor of Welsh sports clubs and societies. The company is currently main shirt sponsor of Principality Premiership club, Merthyr RFC and has partnerships with Newport County AFC, Dragons and Ospreys amongst others.

As of 2017, the company is also a title sponsor of Toby Davis, competing in the Volkswagen Racing Cup for teamHARD.

Charity

Leisuretime works alongside Tŷ Hafan, a Welsh-based charity that provides holistic palliative care for children with life-limiting conditions, organising travel experiences for children at the hospice and their families.

Awards
The company has been recognised by winning several industry awards. Most recently in November 2016 at the British Travel Awards, where it picked up awards in the Best Coach Holiday Company and Best Local Travel Agency categories.

References

External links
Leisuretime website

Travel and holiday companies of the United Kingdom
1995 establishments in Wales